Zephaniah "Zeph" Turner Jr. (December 4, 1812 – March 3, 1876) was a Virginia politician.  He represented Rappahannock County in the Virginia House of Delegates, and served as that body's Speaker from 1869 until 1871.

References
List of former Speakers of the House of Delegates, in the old House chamber in the Virginia State Capitol

Members of the Virginia House of Delegates
Speakers of the Virginia House of Delegates
People from Rappahannock County, Virginia
1812 births
1876 deaths
19th-century American politicians